Adrian J. Slywotzky (born 1951 in New York City) is an American consultant of Ukrainian origin and the author of several books on economic theory and management.

Biography 
Slywotzky was born in the family of Ukrainian immigrants from the Ivano-Frankivs'k region of Ukraine. After getting his undergraduate degree at Harvard, Slywotzky also received a JD from Harvard Law School and an MBA from Harvard Business School. He has worked as a consultant since 1979 and is currently a partner at Oliver Wyman.

Slywotzky wrote several books on profitability and growth, namely the bestselling The Profit Zone. He is one of the most renowned consultants of the United States and was elected as one of the 25 best consultants in 2000 and 2008.

In 2001 he received an honorary professorship from the National University of Kyiv-Mohyla Academy.

He lives in Cambridge, Massachusetts.

Publications 
Books 
Value Migration: How to Think Several Moves Ahead of the Competition (1995) 
The Profit Zone: How Strategic Business Design Will Lead You to Tomorrow's Profits with David J. Morrison and Bob Andelmann (1998) 
Profit Patterns: 30 Ways to Anticipate and Profit from Strategic Forces Reshaping Your Business with David J. Morrison and Ted Moser (1999) 
How Digital Is Your Business with David J. Morrison (2000) 
Profit Patterns: A Field Guide with David J. Morrison (2002) 
The Art of Profitability (2004) 
How to Grow When Markets Don't with Richard Wise (2005) 
The Upside: From Risk Taking to Risk Shaping—How to Turn Your Greatest Threat into Your Biggest Growth Opportunity with Karl Weber (2007) 
Demand: Creating What People Love Before They Know They Want It with Karl Weber (2011)

References

External links 
 

1951 births
Living people
American business theorists
Writers from New York City
Harvard Law School alumni
Harvard Business School alumni
Economists from New York (state)
21st-century American economists